Ivuhos (also known as Ibugos, Ibujos, Vuhus and Ibahos Island) is one of the islands of Batanes, the northernmost province of the Philippines.

Ivuhos Island is small and rather low, except a hill on the south end.  A coral beach before the hill on the eastern side is the only safe landing place on the island.  The shores on both sides of the channel are bordered by reef.  The flood tide sets southward with a velocity from 3 to 4 knots, and the ebb northward.

People
The island is currently uninhabited but the early survey by the U.S. Geodetic Survey in the early 1900s found a settlement near the south end of the island.

Geology
These surround the island, except on the eastern side where the land rises gently from the fringe of sand dunes and small ponds around the shore, in contrast to the  agglomerate cliffs of the island of Sabtang less than  distant. The surface of Ibujos is gently rolling, but without any streams or definite stream valleys. This condition is partly due to the solubility of the rock which allows water to run off in underground channels, but it is also in large part an effect of the recent date of the uplift which formed the island, which has not allowed sufficient time for the streams to form valleys. The soil seems to be volcanic ash rather than limestone.

The Philippine Institute of Volcanology and Seismology (PHIVOLCS) classified Ivujos Island (listed as Ibahos Island) as an inactive volcano of the Philippines.

See also

 Desert island
 List of islands

References

Islands of Batanes
Uninhabited islands of the Philippines
Inactive volcanoes of the Philippines
Volcanoes of the Luzon Strait